George Warren Russell (24 February 1854 – 28 June 1937) was a New Zealand politician from Christchurch. He served as Minister of Internal Affairs and Minister of Public Health in the wartime National government, and was responsible for the New Zealand government's response to the 1918 influenza epidemic.

Private life
Russell was born in London, England, in 1854. His father was a bricklayer and builder. The family emigrated to Tasmania when he was still a child, and then moved again to New Zealand in 1864. Russell worked as an apprentice journalist, before trying to become a Wesleyan Methodist minister. When that was unsuccessful, he returned to journalism, working on the Evening Chronicle in Wellington and founding the Manawatu Herald in Foxton. He moved to Christchurch in 1889. In 1898, he took over the Spectator, a magazine he would edit until 1928.

Political career

A member of the Liberal Party's "left" (radical) wing, he was a strong critic of Premier Richard Seddon, and at the 1896 election attempted to form a Radical Party to push for stronger reforms. He maintained only a tenuous hold on his electorate, losing it in 1896 to William Rolleston, but regaining it in 1899 with a majority of one vote over Rolleston, which brought an end to that political career. Russell lost the Riccarton electorate again in 1902. In 1908, he won the Avon electorate, and held it for the next 11 years.

Russell was considered a possible Liberal leader in 1912 when Sir Joseph Ward resigned, and served in the cabinet of Thomas Mackenzie. He later served in the wartime National cabinet with the Reform Party, holding the portfolios of Internal Affairs, Public Health and Hospitals, as well as a number of lesser responsibilities. Russell was one of the biggest proponents in the Liberal caucus to abandon the National Coalition with Reform. After the caucus voted to leave, he worked with William MacDonald and Thomas Wilford to develop an updated policy manifesto for the next election while Ward was returning to New Zealand from Europe. In his role as Minister of Public Health, he was responsible for the decision to allow  to dock in Auckland in October 1918, and was blamed for the resulting Spanish flu epidemic which killed at least 8,000 New Zealanders. As a result, he lost his electorate in the 1919 election. He unsuccessfully contested the 1921 by-election for Auckland East, and Avon again in the 1922 general election, but was never again elected to Parliament.

In 1935, Russell was awarded the King George V Silver Jubilee Medal.

Death
Russell died on 28 June 1937 in Eastbourne, Wellington. He was buried at Holy Trinity Avonside in Christchurch.

Notes

References

|-

|-

|-

|-

|-

1854 births
1937 deaths
New Zealand Liberal Party MPs
Members of the Cabinet of New Zealand
New Zealand MPs for Christchurch electorates
Chancellors of the University of Canterbury
People from Foxton, New Zealand
Unsuccessful candidates in the 1881 New Zealand general election
Unsuccessful candidates in the 1887 New Zealand general election
Unsuccessful candidates in the 1896 New Zealand general election
Unsuccessful candidates in the 1902 New Zealand general election
Unsuccessful candidates in the 1919 New Zealand general election
Unsuccessful candidates in the 1922 New Zealand general election
Members of the New Zealand House of Representatives
English emigrants to Australia
English emigrants to New Zealand
Burials at Holy Trinity Avonside
New Zealand journalists
19th-century New Zealand politicians